Kala Suri Kala Keerthi Dr. Keselgaspe Manatunga Jayalath Manoratne (12 June 1948 – 12 January 2020), popularly known as Jayalath Manoratne, was an actor in Sri Lankan cinema, stage drama and television. He was a lecturer by profession as well as a director and producer. A highly versatile actor from drama to comedy, Manoratne won awards at OCIC (International Catholic Organization for Cinema and Audiovisual), Presidential, Sarasaviya, Raigam Tele'es, Sumathi and the State Literary and Drama festivals. He was the best actor back to back in 1991 and 1992 for his performance in Socrates and Dvitva. He is considered by critics as one of the five actors who have dominated the Sri Lankan Stage.

He died on 12 January 2020 while receiving treatment for cancer at the age of 71.

Personal life 
Manoratne was born on 12 June 1948 in Dehipe, Nuwara Eliya as the youngest son in the family of six children. His father Keselgaspe Manatunga Perera was a lorry driver and his mother Agalakotuwa Herath Mudiyanselage Leela Kumari was a housewife. He undertook his education at the Dehipe Primary School and Poramadulla Central College. Jayalath has three brothers, Manatunga Seneviratne, Manatunga Wijeratne and Manatunga Ariyaratne and two sisters, Indra Kumari and Mallika Kumari.

At an early age, his music teacher, Sunil Sriyananda, recognised his abilities and encouraged him to take up acting and singing. During his school times, he engaged in several educational as well as extracurricular activities such as Secretary of the Sinhala Literary Association (1965), President of the Theater Council (1966), President of the Sinhala Association (1967–68) and Committee member of the Drama Board and Gandharva congregation (1969). Manoratne was the Student Leader at Boys' Hostel in 1965–66. In 1966, he became the Senior Most Valuable Player in College Inter-Athletic Championship.

After completing his secondary education with Geography, Sinhala and Buddhist Civilization for G.C.E A/L, he attended the University of Peradeniya, where he continued to study drama under the guidance of Professor Ediriweera Sarachchandra. Manoratne completed his master's degree from the University of Sri Jayewardenepura, also obtaining a PhD. He was the only postgraduate to obtain a First Class Degree in 1995. In 2013, he accepted an honorary Doctorate (D. Litt) from the University of Peradeniya. In 1981, he completed an external diploma in Rural Development from the University of Colombo.

He was married to Tamara Jayanthi since 1979 to his death. The couple has one daughter, Uthpala Indeewari and one son, Bhanuka Prabuddha. Uthpala is married to Shivanka Perera and Bhanuka is married to Hiranya Dulashini Gamaariya.

Stage drama career
In 1966 Manoratne started acting when he was a school student, making his acting debut in the stage drama Aspha Gudung, which was selected for the finals of the annual provincial inter-school drama competition and won the Certificate of Excellence in Performance at the All Island Inter-School Drama Competition.

Originally playing minor roles in plays as Maname, Sinhabahu under Sarachchandra's guidance, Manoratne embarked on a mainstream acting career, beginning with the operatic play Premato Jayati Soko with the role "Uddala Bamuna". Whilst performing in this play he met his future wife, Tamara Jayanthi. Manoratne went to Nuwara Eliya Kachcheri to get a job and at that time, he produced remakes of Sarachchandra's plays Raththaran and Elowa Gihin Melowa Awa. He has acted under all the five major stage drama directors in Sri Lankan history - Sarachchandra, Sugathapala de Silva, Dayananda Gunawardena, Gunasena Galappatty and Henry Jayasena.

In 1980, he produced his maiden theater play Mahagiri Damba. His only translation drama play came through Puthra Samagama produced in 1985. It is the adaptation of Russian play The Elder Son by Alexander Vampilov. In 1988, he produced the popular play Thalamala Pipila and then Andarela in 1993. The play Andarela also brings Manoratne's first documentary role. In 1996 he produced Guru Tharuwa and then Sanda Gira in 1998. He continuously produced plays of many genres in following years including Kaneru Mal (2000), Lokaya Thani Yayak (2005), Makara remake (2007), Sudu Redi Horu (2008), Buruwa Mahaththaya (2012), Sellam Nirindu (2013) and Handa Nihanda (2016). During the 26 consecutive years from 1980 to 2016, he made nearly 15 plays.

From that time on Manoratne acted in over 80 plays, and directed eleven plays of his own. His play Andarela won the State Literary Award in 1995 and then Guru Tharuwa won State Literary Award in 1996.

In 2014, Manoratne performed in a theater festival named Dawas Pahalos Daha (fifteen thousand days), which showcased a collection of eight plays representing different periods and issues and produced by Manoratne himself. These eight stage plays were Lokaya Thani Yayak, Sellam Nirindu, Thalamala Pipila, Buruwa Mahaththaya, Guru Tharuwa, Andarela and Puthra Samagama.

Notable stage dramas

Ahas Maliga
Andarela
Andirale Nadagama
Angara Ganga Gala Basi
Ape Panthi Kamaraya
Api Gewanne Na
Asaatha Manthare
Aspha Gudung
Buruwa Mahaththaya
Chitrage Prema Kathawa
Debiddo
Diwes Helanu Mena
Don Juan
Dunna Dunu Gamuve
Dvitva 
Elowa Gihin Melowa Awa
Gajaman Puwatha
Guru Tharuwa 
Handa Nihanda
Hiru Nathi Lowa
Horu Samaga Heluwen
Jasaya Saha Lenchina
Kaneru Mal
Lokaya Thani Yayak
Lucinde
Maala Walalu
Maa Wani Bilinda
Madhura Javanika
Madhura Pura
Magul Prastava
Maha Giri Damba
Mahe Hene Kathawa
Maha Hene Riri Yaka
Mahasara
Makara
Maname
Mayadevi
Megha
Modara Mola
Naaga Gurula
Nari Bena
Nariya Saha Keju
Nelum Pokuna
Oththukaraya 
Pematho Jayathi Soko
Perahera Enawo
Pokuru Wassa
Puthra Samagama
Raassa Saha Paraassa
Raththaran remake
Ratu Hattakari
Rhinoceros
Sahathika Nokala Maranayak
Sanda Gira
Sapiriwara Mathin
Satha Saha Satha
Sathuru Mithuru
Sellam Nirindu
Serade Seetha
Sihina Sappuwa
Sinhabahu
Siri Sangabo
Socrates
Subhasadhaka
Subha Saha Yasa
Suddek Oba Amathai
Sudu Redi Horu
Tharavo Igilethi
Thawath Udesanak
Thala Mala Pipila
Ukdandu Ginna
Wasudeva
Wessanthara
Yathra

Television
Manoratne started his television career with the drama Aebeddiya of Parakrama Niriella. Then he showcased his ability through many serials such as Doo Daruwo, Sindui Bindui, Gamperaliya. His role as "Punsiri" in Doo Daruwo became highly popularized. He became popular in comedy roles in Bodima and then in Ramya Suramya. In 2005, Manoratne played triple roles for the first time in Sri Lankan teledrama history in a miniplay directed and scripted by himself, titled Thunpath Ratawaka Lassana. In 2006, he directed the serial Mage Kaviya Mata Denna.

Apart from acting, Manoratne also directed many television serials such as Sekku Gedara, Ransirige Sangramaya, Mage Kaviya Mata Denna, Thunpath Ratawaka Lassana, Eeye Ada Saha Heta and Thaththe Api Awa. He also directed single episode miniplays such as Bappage Paminima, Aege Awurudda, Raja Thun Kattuwa, Nidahasa, Seettuwa, Denna Demallo, Sathuru Mithuru, Duppathunda Adaraya Karathi, Santhapaya and Buddha Puthra.

Selected television serials

 Abeddiya
 Arungal
Bodima
Bumuthurunu
Deiyo Sakki
 Deweni Yuddhaya
 Deweni Gamana 
Doo Daruwo
 Doratu Rakinno
 Dumriya Andaraya
Eeye Ada Saha Heta'Gal Pilimaya Saha Bol Pilimaya Gajaman NonaGamperaliyaGanga Saha NissankaHath Pana Hiru Sandu HamuweHiruta MuwawenIrata Handana Mal 2 Jeewithaya DakinnaKande GedaraMadol Doowa Mage Kaviya Mata DennaManik Nadiya Gala BasiMan Nathida MinissuMoragiri KandaNomerena MinissuNopipena Mal Passe Gena Manamali (1989)Pateelage Kathawa Pawara MenuwaraPunchi Patau Ramya SuramyaRanketi Doni Roda Hatara ManamalayaSabanda EliyasSakisanda EliyasSamanali Sanda AmawakaiSandara VandanaSasara SandaSaradiel SedonaSenehasata AmanthranayakSindui BinduiSooriya Kusuma Thunpath Ratawaka Lassana 
 Uthuwankande Sura Saradiyel Veeduru Mal VinivindimiVisithunweni Horawa Walakulu Wanabime Sirakaruwo WarnaWetath Niyarath Weten EhaRadio Play
  Tharuwan Saranai 
  Bashmanthara

Author worksDolos Mahe PahanaDawasa Thawamath TharunaiMinihata Ninda Yanda AtiPiyadasa saha KumariyaSindu BinduSinhala Naatye Prasangika Kalathmaka WardhanayaWahi EnathuruIllness and death
Manoratne suffered from a brain cancer for sometime. On 13 November 2018, he was admitted to a private hospital, Colombo at 2.00 p.m and underwent a surgery for a brain tumor. After the surgery he continued to work in dramas for a brief period, when the illness got worse. He continued to take medical treatment from Apeksha Cancer Hospital, Maharagama since mid 2019. On 12 January 2020, he died while receiving treatment at the hospital. Funeral took place on 15 January 2020 and cremated at Boralesgamuwa.

Filmography
Manoratne started his cinema career with a minor role in Thilaka and Thilaka in 1979. Then he entered professional cinema acting through the 1979 film Handaya which was directed by Titus Thotawatte. Since then, he has acted in more than 30 films across many genres of drama, romance, thriller and comedy. He was a recipient of Kalasuri and Kala Keerthi due to his enormous contribution to the drama career. Some of his notable films include Sooriya Arana, Ho Gaana Pokuna, Bherunda Pakshiya and Walapatala, where he was awarded for best actor and best supporting actor in many ceremonies. His final film act came through Theja Iddamalgoda's debut film Ashavari.

Awards and accolades
He has won several awards at the local stage drama festivals and television festivals, both for acting and direction.
 State Literary Awards – for his two books Andarela and Guru Tharuwa Manoratne's script Thalamala Pipila is prescribed for G.C.E O/L syllabus.

State Literary Awards

|-
|| 1974 ||| Rathu Hattakari || Best Actor || 
|-
|| 1985 ||| Puthra Samagama || Best Actor || 
|-
|| 1988 ||| Thalamala Pipila || Best Actor || 
|-
|| 1988 ||| Thalamala Pipila || Best Director || 
|-
|| 1988 ||| Thalamala Pipila || Best Script || 
|-
|| 1990 ||| Socrates || Best Actor || 
|-
|| 1991 ||| Dvitva || Best Actor || 
|-
|| 1993 ||| Andarela || Best Script || 
|-
|| 1995 ||| Andarela || Best Play || 
|-
|| 1996 ||| Guru Tharuwa || Best Script || 
|-
|| 1996 ||| Guru Tharuwa || Best Play || 

Sarasaviya Awards

|-
|| 1988 ||| Mangala Thegga || Best Supporting Actor || 
|-
|| 2004 ||| Sudu Kaluwara || Best Supporting Actor || 
|-
|| 2007 ||| Berunda Pakshiya || Best Supporting Actor || 
|-
|| 2015 ||| Ho Gaana Pokuna || Best Supporting Actor || 

Raigam Tele'es

|-
|| 2009 ||| Arungal || Best Actor || 
|-
|| 2013 ||| Service to the drama || Prathibha Prabha Award || 

Sumathi Awards

|-
|| 2002 ||| Sanda Amawakai || Best Actor || 
|-
|| 2004 ||| Ramya Suramya || Best Script || 

Hiru Golden Film Award

|-
|| 2016 ||| Ho Gaana Pokuna || Best Comedian || 

Derana Film Awards

|-
|| 2016 ||| Ho Gaana Pokuna || Best Supporting Actor || 

SIGNIS Awards

|-
|| 1988 ||| Mangala Thegga || Best Supporting Actor || 
|-
|| 2016 ||| Ho Gaana Pokuna || Best Supporting Actor || 

Presidential Film Awards

|-
|| 2006 ||| Bherunda Pakshiya || Best Supporting Actor || 
|-
|| 2017 ||| Ho Gaana Pokuna'' || Best Supporting Actor ||

References

External links
 
 
 මමෝ මුහුණු නවයක 
 මනෝට දැන් සුවයි
 රාජ්‍ය නාට්‍ය උළෙලේදී ජයලත් මනෝරත්නයන් නාට්‍ය කීර්ති සම්මානයෙන් පිදුම් ලබයි
 ගුරු තරුව බැසයයි
 ජයලත් මනෝරත්න - රේඩියෝ නාට්‍ය (භෂ්මාන්තර)

Sinhala articles
 දොළොස් මහේ පහන දල්වා 49 වසරකට පසු
 දවසක් පුරා ඇසක් වසාගෙන
 සර් වූ මචං
 මනෝ තෝරාගත් පුදුම හත
 දිවිමඟ විසිතුරු
 ජ්‍යේෂ්ඨ සහ ශ්‍රේෂ්ඨ මනෝ
 මනෝ ගැන මනෝ කී කතා
 මනෝරත්නගේ නිමල ළමාවියේ මිහිරිමතකය
 ඔහුගේම රංගනවේදයක් ලංකාවට හඳුන්වා දුන්නා
 දවස තවමත් තරුණයි

1948 births
2020 deaths
Deaths from brain tumor
Sri Lankan male television actors
Sinhalese male actors
Sri Lankan male film actors